El Capo is the seventh studio album by American rapper Jim Jones. It was released on May 31, 2019 via Vamp Life, Roc Nation and EMPIRE Distribution. Produced entirely by The Heatmakerz, it features guest appearances from Marc Scibilia, Cam'ron, Trav, Ball Greezy, Benny the Butcher, Conway the Machine, Curren$y, Dave East, Drama, Fabolous, Fat Joe, Fred the Godson, Guordan Banks, Jadakiss, Juelz Santana, Maino, Philthy Rich, Rain910 and Rick Ross.

The deluxe edition of the album was released on November 27, 2020 with fifteen extra songs.

Background 
Jones first announced the album's release date on May 28 through his instagram, and revealed it was to be produced entirely by the Heatmakerz.

Track listing
All tracks produced by the Heatmakerz.

Charts

References 

2019 albums
Jim Jones (rapper) albums
Empire Distribution albums
Albums produced by the Heatmakerz